Jeremy Laldinpuia (born 3 June 2000) is an Indian professional footballer who plays as a midfielder for I-League club Aizawl.

Club career 
Born in Mizoram, Laldinpuia began his career with the Shillong Lajong youth team. On 16 July 2018, it was announced that Landinpuia had signed with Mizoram Premier League club Chanmari. He stayed with the club until 2021, joining Hindustan.

Aizawl 
In August 2022, Laldinpuia signed with I-League club Aizawl. He made his debut for the club on 8 September 2022 against Chawnpui in the opening round of the Mizoram Premier League. Laldinpuia scored his first goal in the same match, his 38th minute strike giving Aizawl the lead in their 4–2 victory.

On 15 November 2022, Laldinpuia made his professional debut for Aizawl in their opening I-League match against TRAU. He came on as a last minute substitute in the 1–1 draw.

Career statistics

Club

References

External links
Profile at the All India Football Federation

2000 births
Living people
Sportspeople from Mizoram
Footballers from Mizoram
Indian footballers
Association football midfielders
Chanmari FC players
Hindustan FC players
Aizawl FC players
Mizoram Premier League players
I-League players